Marmarium or Marmarion was a town of ancient Euboea. According to Strabo, Marmarium was situated upon the coast near Carystus, opposite Halae Araphenides in Attica. The quarries at Marmarium produced a celebrated green marble, with white zones – the Cipollino marble of the Romans.

Its site is located near the modern village of Marmari.

References 

Populated places in ancient Euboea
Former populated places in Greece
Marble